The Violin Player is a 1994 French-Belgian drama film directed by Charles Van Damme. It was entered into the 1994 Cannes Film Festival.

Cast
 Richard Berry as Armand
 François Berléand as Charles
 Bernard Ballet as Koehler
 Inês de Medeiros as Lydia
 John Dobrynine as Daraud
 Geno Lechner as Ariane
 Hanns Zischler as Michael

References

External links

1994 films
French drama films
Belgian drama films
1990s French-language films
1994 drama films
Films about violins and violinists
Films directed by Charles Van Damme
French-language Belgian films
1990s French films